"The Gunslinger and the Dark Man" is a fantasy short story by American writer Stephen King, originally published in The Magazine of Fantasy and Science Fiction in November 1981. In 1982, "The Gunslinger and the Dark Man" was collected with several other stories King published in The Magazine of Fantasy and Science Fiction as The Dark Tower: The Gunslinger. "The Gunslinger and the Dark Man" formed the fifth and final chapter of the book, and was slightly revised for the inclusion. For the Revised and Expanded edition published in 2003, "The Gunslinger and the Dark Man" was retitled to "The Gunslinger and the Man in Black."

Plot

After sacrificing Jake in the mountain, Roland makes his way down to speak to the man in black. The man reads Roland's fate from a pack of Tarot cards, including "the sailor" (Jake), "the prisoner" (Eddie Dean) "the lady of shadows" (Susannah Dean), "death" (but not for Roland), and the Tower itself, as the center of everything. The man in black states that he is merely a pawn of Roland's true enemy, the one who now controls the Dark Tower itself.

Roland attacks the man in black, who retaliates by knocking Roland out with an incantation. Roland enters a terrifying visionary hallucination revealing the nature of the cosmos. When Roland awakens, he finds that nothing is left of the man except his skeleton, and that he himself has aged ten years. He takes the skeleton's jawbone with him as he departs, as a replacement for the one he had given to Jake in "The Oracle and the Mountains." 

The gunslinger continues traveling by foot until he reaches the Western Sea.

See also

Short fiction by Stephen King

References

1981 short stories
Fantasy short stories
The Dark Tower (series) short stories
Works originally published in The Magazine of Fantasy & Science Fiction